Colosseum is a rural locality in the Gladstone Region, Queensland, Australia.

Geography 
The locality is bounded to the west by the ridge of the Many Peaks Range and to the south-east loosely by Baffle Creek at the foot of the Gwynne Range (in the neighbouring locality of Mount Tom to the west).

The Bruce Highway passes through the locality from south (Gindoran) to north (Miriam Vale). The North Coast railway line passes through the locality from south-east (Lowmead) to north-east (Miriam Vale / Mount Tom). 

The north-west corner of the locality is within Bulburin National Park which extends into neighbouring locality of Boyne Valley. A second disconnected part of Bulburin National Park incorporates part of the western edge of Colosseum, extending into Boyne Valley and neighbouring Gindoran to the south-west. The Mount Colosseum National Park is in the east of the locality.

Apart from the protected areas, the land use is a mixture of plantation forestry (mostly in the south-west of the locality) and grazing on native vegetation. The residential area are mostly around the Bruce Highway in the north of the locality.

There are a number of mountains in the locality including (from north to south):

History 
The section of the North Coast railway line from Rosedale to Iveragh opened on 1 October 1897 with the locality being served by the now-abandoned Colosseum railway station.

Polmaily Provisional School opened on 22 August 1900. On 1 January 1909 it became Polmaily State School. It closed in 1935. The school was at  664 Blackmans Gap Road.

The Polmaily State School War Memorial is at the back of the former Polmaily State School site  in bushland. It commemorates 18 pupils of the school who served in World War I. It was unveiled on Friday 13 December 1918 by Elizabeth Smith, wife of the Presbyterian minister Thomas Smith, who also spoke at the ceremony. The couple had two sons who served in the war, Sydney Francis and Archibald Philip. The memorial was organised by Charles Row Vanderwolf whose two sons Charles Jakeman and Harry served with Charles Jakeman killed. Although the school land is now used for other purposes, a  land parcel has been set aside as a reserve for the war memorial with the Gladstone Regional Council appointed as trustee.

Bariveloe State School opened on 2 August 1927 and closed on 15 June 1947. The school was located on Bariveloe Road just south of Colosseum Creek (approx ).

Education 
There are no schools in Colosseum. The nearest primary schools are Miriam Vale State School in neighbouring Miriam Vale to the north and Lowmead State School in neighbouring Lowmead to the southeast. The nearest secondary schools are Miriam Vale State School (to Year 10), Rosedale State School (to Year 12) in Rosedale to the south, and Tannum Sands State High School in Tannum Sands to the north-east.

References 

Gladstone Region
Localities in Queensland